Wietse van Lankveld (born 4 May 1997) is a Dutch footballer who plays as a midfielder for UDI '19.

Club career
He made his Eerste Divisie debut for Helmond Sport on 5 May 2017 in a game against FC Eindhoven.

References

External links
 

1997 births
People from Veghel
Living people
Dutch footballers
Association football midfielders
Helmond Sport players
Eerste Divisie players
Vierde Divisie players
Footballers from North Brabant